Let Us Burn – Elements & Hydra Live in Concert (or simply Let Us Burn) is a live album, DVD and Blu-ray Disc from Dutch symphonic metal band Within Temptation. It was released in November, 2014 and is available on 2-disc DVD, 2-disc CD, 2-disc Blu-ray and digital album. The live album features two performances, being the first one the greatest part of the band's 15th anniversary concert at the Sportpaleis, entitled Elements, and the second one the band's performance at the AFAS Live during the Hydra World Tour.

Background
On 9 May 2012, the band officially announced special a concert entitled "Elements" at the Sportpaleis, in Antwerp, in celebration of their 15-year anniversary. Il Novecento Orchestra accompanied the band among other special guests, including ex-band members and former Orphanage vocalist George Oosthoek. The show was sold out with fans from over 50 reported countries in attendance. No plans for a video album were in mind at the time, and as the band disliked the final result, they moved forward on the next album tour. As Hydra was released, the band decided to record a live album featuring a concert and announced via their facebook account that they were going to record the concert in Amsterdam at the same evening for a later release. During an interview for Sonic Cathedral, lead vocalist Sharon den Adel stated that the plan was originally to make a Hydra live album as plans for the Elements concert turning into a live album were early dropped as the band found themselves unhappy with the end result, so they opted to left only a few songs as extra content, but in the edition final process they decided to change the main concert to Elements as they realized the event was an important moment for their history, and after some work on the material they considered it a worthy material then. Den Adel also commented that having Black Symphony as the previous live video released, Elements would be the only possible follow up as it wasn't a common concert. Some ex-members were invited to the Elements concert as they were somehow part of the band's history, as Martijn Westerholt and Michiel Papenhove. Both of them executed their original instruments during the track "Candles", in which was composed while they're still band's studio or touring members at the time.

Both concerts had missing songs on the final edition cut. The concert at the Sportpaleis also featured "Never-Ending Story", "Titanium", "Summertime Sadness", "Grenade", "Memories", "What Have You Done" and "Our Farewell" while the concert at the Heineken Music Hall missed "Our Solemn Hour", "Angels", "See Who I Am", "The Cross" and "Summertime Sadness".

Upon its release, Let Us Burn charted on multiple charts, including number 5 on the Dutch Album charts, as well as number 2 on the United Kingdom Music Video charts, their first to do so.

Track listing

Personnel
Sharon den Adel – vocals
Ruud Jolie – lead guitar
Stefan Helleblad – rhythm guitar
Jeroen van Veen – bass
Martijn Spierenburg – keyboards
Mike Coolen – drums

Guest musicians
George Oosthoek – growls on "Candles" at Elements
Robert Westerholt – rhythm guitar on Elements and growls on "Silver Moonlight" at Hydra
Martijn Westerholt – keyboards on "Candles" at Elements
Michiel Papenhove – lead guitar on "Candles" at Elements
Koen van den Broek – percussion on "The Last Dance" at Elements
Milangelo Martis – percussion on "The Last Dance" at Elements
Il Novecento Orchestra
Fine Fleur Choir

Chart positions

Album

DVD

References

Within Temptation albums
2014 live albums
2014 video albums
Live video albums